Vladimir Pekin (born 10 August 1986) is a Bulgarian footballer currently playing for Vidima Rakovski

External links 
 

1986 births
Living people
Bulgarian footballers
First Professional Football League (Bulgaria) players
PFC Vidima-Rakovski Sevlievo players
Place of birth missing (living people)
Association football midfielders